Project Vietnam Foundation is a non-profit program of the American Academy of Pediatrics providing hygiene, medical and educational facilities in Vietnam. The organization was established in 1996 by Dr. Quynh Kieu, a Pediatrician, and operated in the city of Fountain Valley, California, USA.

The declared mission is to ensure healthcare assistance to children at-risk, poor rural communities, and medical training to health professionals in the country.

The organization identified Vitamin K deficiency as a major cause of newborn death, campaigned successfully for the implementation of a Vietnam national policy for Vitamin K injection after birth.

Projects and programs (in 2007)
 Newborn Care Initiative Project, a lead program to set up a network for newborn care in all 64 provinces of Vietnam, in order to lower infant mortality and provide chances for quality life of the 1.6 million born annually babies.
 Vitamin K for Newborns.
 Medical Technology Development - CPAP Device.
 Medical mission trips, providing training and medical operations by foreign experts.
 Emergency Care Training, 2–3 days courses at multiple regional centers, including Bach Mai Hospital. The injury accounts for 65% of children deaths over the age of 5 years old.
 Birth Defects Program (Hòa Bình).
 Injury Prevention.
 Infection Control.
 Children with Congenital Heart Disease.
 Development of pediatric and medical specialties.
 Scholarships, about US$150 for student per year.
 Malnutrition Reduction, Anemia Reduction, School Health Program.

References

External links
Project Vietnam Foundation Home Page
Project Vietnam Foundation Blog
Project Vietnam Foundation Facebook
This article is related to the List of non-governmental organizations in Vietnam.

Organizations established in 1996
Charities based in California
Foreign charities operating in Vietnam
1996 establishments in California
Organizations based in Orange County, California